Justice Royce may refer to:

Homer Elihu Royce, associate justice and chief justice of the Vermont Supreme Court
Stephen Royce, associate justice and chief justice of the Vermont Supreme Court